Rhein-Main Air Base (located at ) was a United States Air Force air base near the city of Frankfurt am Main, Germany.  It was a Military Airlift Command (MAC) and United States Air Forces in Europe (USAFE) installation, occupying the south side of Frankfurt Airport. Its military airport codes  are discontinued. Established in 1945, Rhein-Main Air Base was the primary airlift and passenger hub for USAFE. It was billed as the "Gateway to Europe". It closed on 30 December 2005.

During its lifetime, the base's host airlift wing operated C-130 Hercules and Douglas C-9A Nightingale aircraft, as well as supporting many transient C-5 Galaxy, C-141 Starlifter, C-17 Globemaster III, KC-135 Stratotanker and KC-10 Extender flight operations each day. Daily or weekly contract air passenger flights were also conducted for United States personnel arriving in or leaving Europe.

Arrival

After the U.S. 7th Army moved through the Frankfurt area, the 826th Engineer Aviation Battalion (EAB), a unit of the IX Engineer Command, arrived at Frankfurt/Rhein-Main Airfield on 26 April 1945. It was classified as Advanced Landing Ground (ALG) Y-73. On 11 May 1945, the engineers began the task of clearing rubble and reconstructing major buildings. The Army engineers built new runways, aprons and hardstands, and taxiways leading to the terminal, as well as extending and widening the existing runway.

Frankfurt/Rhein-Main Airfield was initially used by the Ninth Air Force as a tactical fighter base. Tactical air groups stationed at the airfield were:
 362d Fighter Group (8 April 1945 - 30 April 1945)
 377th Fighter Group (14 April 1945 - 2 May 1945)
 378th Fighter Group (14 April 1945 - 2 May 1945)
 379th Fighter Group (8 April 1945 - 30 April 1945)
 425th Night Fighter Squadron (12 April 1945 - 2 May 1945)

Air Transport

The initial USAAF transport unit at Rhein-Main was the 466th Air Service Group, activated on 20 November 1945. The 466th operated the aerial port, with a mixture of C-47 Skytrain, C-46 Commando, and C-54 Skymaster transport aircraft using the base for transport operations. The Rhein-Main transport passenger and cargo terminal was completed in 1946, and air traffic into Rhein-Main increased after the closure of the military passenger terminal at Orly Air Base, France, in March 1947, when the USAFE Eastern Air Transport Service opened its hub at Rhein-Main.

The 61st Troop Carrier Group was reassigned to Rhein-Main on 30 September 1946 from nearby Eschborn Air Base and assumed control of the transport mission, carrying out routine transport operations from the base using C-47s and C-54s. Troop Carrier Squadrons of the 61st TCG were the 14th, 15th, and 53rd.

Berlin Airlift

The ongoing dispute over Berlin strained relations between the Soviet Union and the Western Allies (United States, United Kingdom, France). On 24 June 1948, the Soviet Union blocked access to the three Western-held sectors of Berlin, which lay deep within the Soviet-controlled zone of Germany, by cutting off all rail and road routes going through Soviet-controlled territory in Germany. The commander of the American occupation zone in Germany, General Lucius D. Clay, USA, gave the order on 25 June to launch a massive airlift using both civil and military aircraft. Rhein-Main Air Base became the main American terminal in western Germany for the airlift. The aircraft of the 61st TCG participated using C-54 Skymasters to ferry coal, flour, and other cargo into West Berlin. Additional Troop Carrier Squadrons were assigned to the 61st group, these being the 20th, 48th, and 54th.

On 19 November 1948, the 513th Troop Carrier Group (Special) was activated at Rhein-Main Air Base to assist in the airlift, also using C-54s. Squadrons of the 513th were the 313th, 330th, 331st, 332d, and 333d.

The Soviet Union lifted its blockade at 00:01, on 12 May 1949. However, the airlift did not end until 30 September, as the Western nations wanted to build up sufficient amounts of supplies in West Berlin in case the Soviets blockaded it again.

1949–1959

Although originally envisioned as a bomber base by USAFE, as a result of the Berlin Airlift, Rhein-Main became a principal European air transport terminal. With the end of the blockade, the 513th TCG was inactivated on 16 October 1949. The 61st TCG returned to routine transport operations until the outbreak of the Korean War.  The 61st was reassigned to McChord Air Force Base, Washington on 21 July 1950.

The 61st was replaced by the 60th Troop Carrier Wing, which transferred from Wiesbaden Air Base, West Germany on 2 June 1950. The 60th was equipped with the heavier C-82 Packet cargo aircraft. In 1953, the C-119 Flying Boxcar arrived, bringing an increased cargo capability to the wing. The 60th TCW consisted of the following squadrons:
 10th Troop Carrier Squadron
 11th Troop Carrier Squadron
 12th Troop Carrier Squadron

In 1955, with the opening of USAFE bases in France, most heavy transport flights were shifted there and Rhein-Main became a passenger and tactical cargo hub. The 60th Troop Carrier Wing relocated to Dreux-Louvillier Air Base, France on 15 October 1955. The 1614th Support Squadron of the Military Air Transport Service's (MATS) 1602d Air Transport Wing headquartered at Châteauroux, France provided aircraft maintenance, passenger services, air cargo handling, hotel operations and airlift operational support during the 1950s and 1960s. Rhein-Main was placed under the 7310th Air Base Wing, which for over a decade provided ground service as well as cargo and passenger loading and unloading for USAFE and MATS transports.

During the Cold War, the dependents of military and government personnel living on base or in the surrounding communities attended Gail S. Halvorsen Elementary School, Rhein-Main Elementary School, William H. Tunner Middle School, Rhein-Main Junior High School, and Frankfurt American High School.

USAFE turned over the northern part of the base to the German government for use as Flughafen Frankfurt am Main, the chief commercial airport for the greater Frankfurt area, in April 1959. The remainder of the base stayed in USAF hands as the principal aerial port for the Department of Defense in Germany.

435th Tactical Airlift Wing 

The 1966 closure of USAFE bases in France increased cargo traffic at Rhein-Main extensively. On 1 July 1969, MAC transferred the 435th Tactical Airlift Wing from RAF High Wycombe in the United Kingdom to Rhein-Main as host unit and upgraded its facilities. Squadrons assigned to Rhein-Main along with the 435th TAW were:
 37th Tactical Airlift Squadron (assigned 1 October 1977) (Lockheed C-130 Hercules)
 55th Aeromedical Airlift Squadron (assigned 31 March 1975) (McDonnell Douglas C-9A Nightingale)
 630th Military Airlift Support Squadron (MASSq)
 322nd Combat Support Group (CSG)
There were also other Military Airlift Command Squadrons in USAFE, notably at Torrejón AB in Spain and Inçirlik AB in Turkey, which were made part of the 435th TAW.

The 630th MASSq operated Rhein-Main's freight and passenger terminals and provided aircraft maintenance for transitory Boeing C-17 Globemaster III, C-141 Starlifter and C-5 Galaxy aircraft supporting aerial ports in Europe, the Middle East, and Africa. TDY support of missions was not uncommon. Rhein-Main AB was the principal Port of Entry for all U.S. servicemen and women serving in West Germany as well as military and diplomatic air freight destined for U.S. bases and embassies throughout Europe, the Middle East, and Africa.

The 37th TAS took part in airlift operations during Operations Desert Shield/Storm in Southwest Asia (the Middle East), from 14 August 1990 – 29 March 1991. It also air-dropped humanitarian supplies in Operation Provide Comfort for the relief of fleeing Kurdish refugees in northern Iraq in April–May 1991. The 37th AS conducted airlift and airdrop missions to Bosnia and Herzegovina for Operation Provide Promise, starting July 1992.

The 55th Aeromedical Airlift Squadron flew aeromedical missions throughout Europe, Africa and the Middle East.

During the 1980s, Rhein-Main AB was the primary airbase supporting a program run by the Deputy Assistant Secretary of Defense for Global Affairs, under the authority of the late George M. Dykes, IV, who was DoD Director of Humanitarian Assistance, supporting Afghan guerrillas (at that time known as Mujaheddin) in their fight against the Soviet Union.  Over 100 Afghan Relief Flights, flown by Lockheed C-141 Starlifter and Lockheed C-5 Galaxy aircraft, and ten Pack Animal Transport flights, flown by Flying Tigers Airlines B747F aircraft (which transported Texas mules to Afghanistan in a covert operation to provide logistics to the Afghan guerrillas, were routed through the airbase.  This included a series of approximately 50 aeromedical evacuation flights that brought combat wounded Afghan guerrillas and, from time to time, women and children from Chaklala's PAF Base Nur Khan in Pakistan to the US and Europe for reconstructive surgery after they lost hands, feet, legs, or arms.  These flights were supported by the 55th Aeromedical Airlift Squadron with medical aircrews from the 2d Aeromedical Evacuation Squadron.

On 1 July 1975, the USAF and Military Airlift Command entered into an agreement with the Federal Republic of Germany that only transport aircraft would be stationed at Rhein-Main Air Base.

Events of note at Rhein-Main Air Base:
 On December 10, 1978, the first group of military dependents evacuated from Iran on C-141s landed in Rhein-Main after leaving Tehran late the day before. They had spent the first night in Athens, their second leg of the trip was to Rhein-Main and then they were transported to McGuire Air Force Base.  Each plane held approximately 150 women and children.
 On January 20, 1981, the American hostages held during the Iran hostage crisis were flown to Rhein-Main in a C-9A Nightingale aeromedical aircraft.
 On 23 October 1983, the bombing of the Marine barracks in Beirut, Lebanon occurred.  Rhein Main AB was instrumental in the processing of the casualties from that bombing in the days and weeks to follow. 241 military personnel perished in the blast.
 On August 8, 1985, the Red Army Faction snuck a car laden with explosives onto the base and parked it behind the headquarters building. At approximately 7:15 AM the car exploded, killing Airman first class Frank Scarton of Michigan and Becky Jo Bristol of San Antonio, Texas, and wounding 20 others.
 In 1990, Rhein-Main Air Base was a major staging base for supplies and equipment heading to the Gulf War.

Post-Cold War use 

The U.S. staged Operation Provide Hope, a symbolic yet substantial airlift in February 1992 to the former Soviet Union, from Rhein-Main AB. A closing ceremony to the airlift phase (a much larger ground phase of Operation Provide Hope began in the spring) was held in late February at Rhein-Main AB, using a Russian Antonov An-124 cargo aircraft to transport the last shipment of air-delivered supplies.

On 1 April 1992 the 435th TAW was realigned from Military Airlift Command (MAC) to United States Air Forces in Europe (USAFE) and redesignated as the 435th Airlift Wing (435 AW). The 37th Tactical Airlift Squadron (37 TAS) became the 37th Airlift Squadron (37 AS) on the same date. At its peak, Rhein-Main AB had a population of 10,000. However, by 1993, USAF officials announced the intent to downsize the base by half.

On 1 July 1993, the 55th Aeromedical Airlift Squadron moved to Ramstein Air Base with its C-9A Nightingale aircraft. The 37th Airlift Squadron was subsequently reassigned to Ramstein on 1 October 1994. With these moves completed and most heavy Air Mobility Command (AMC) airlifters moving transcontinental cargo and passenger traffic to Ramstein and Spangdahlem Air Base, the stage was set for a complete closure in 2005.

On 1 April 1995, the 435 AW was inactivated. The 435 AW was replaced by the 469th Air Base Group under USAFE and the 726th Air Mobility Squadron (726 AMS) under AMC. The 469 ABG inactivated on 10 October 2005. The 726th Air Mobility Squadron was the last unit at the base.

From September 2001 until 2005, Rhein-Main continued to provide support for transient C-130, C-141, C-17, C-5, KC-135, KC-10 and AMC-chartered civilian airliners supporting both US military activities throughout Europe, as well as a waypoint for air mobility operations throughout Southwest Asia towards the wars in Afghanistan and Iraq.

Special Operations

Although the major mission of Rhein-Main Air Base was strategic and tactical airlift, the base also operated a substantial special operations mission.

The 7406th Operations Squadron was activated at Rhein-Main on 10 May 1955 and received its first aircraft (RB-50s) in March 1956. The RB-50s were replaced with specially configured C-130A-II reconnaissance aircraft in 1958. The 7406th owned and maintained the aircraft and provided the flight crews. A separate USAF Security Service squadron provided the crew for the intelligence collection positions on the aircraft. One of these C-130s (56-0528) was shot down with the loss of a crew of seventeen over Yerevan, Soviet Armenia on 2 September 1958. Four Soviet MiG-17 pilots took turns firing on the unarmed C-130 when the American aircraft penetrated Soviet airspace while on a mission along the Turkish-Armenian border.

Between June 5–10, 1967, during the Arab-Israeli Six-Day War, the 7406th flew dangerous, unarmed missions over the battle gathering electronic intelligence data. The 7406th continued flying recon missions from Rhein-Main in the C-130B models until 30 June 1973 when the squadron's sister Security Service flying squadron moved to Ellinikon International Airport, near Athens, Greece (known to the U.S. as Hellenikon AB).  Operational missions were flown until 13 June 1974 from Greece when the unit was disbanded. The 7206th nomenclature continued, embodied in the 7206th Air Base Group which was a support group in Athens until 1993. Surveillance missions continued at Hellenikon under the auspices of the 6916th ESS.

With the relocation of the 7406th to Greece, the 7th Special Operations Squadron was moved from Ramstein to Rhein-Main as one of the units shuffled as part of Operation Creek Action. The 7406th's Hercules had been used for covert communications intelligence (COMINT) missions along the Eastern Bloc borders. The 7th SOS's MC-130Es, code-named 'Combat Talon', were no less mysterious and were also striking to look at with their matte black camouflage scheme and two large hooks on the nose. The 7th SOS's MC-130Es were spotted in every corner of Europe. The 7th SOS was reassigned to the 7575th Operations Group in 1977, and then to the 39th Aerospace Rescue and Recovery Wing on 1 February 1987. It was relocated to RAF Alconbury in the United Kingdom in December 1992, coming under a different group in the process.

The 7575th Operations Group operated at Rhein-Main from 1 July 1977 to 31 March 1991. Initially, three unique units were assigned to the group: the 7405th Operations Squadron, the 7580th Operations Squadron, and the 7th Special Operations Squadron. The 7405th had recently moved from Wiesbaden Air Base and converted to flying heavily modified C-130E Hercules airlifters. The 7580th was staffed with electronic warfare officers and specialized aircraft maintenance personnel who flew in the back of or maintained the 7405th's aircraft. The mission of the 7405th and 7580th was to conduct covert reconnaissance flights through the West Berlin Air Corridor, also known as the Berlin corridors and control zone.

Closure
On 23 December 1999, the U.S. and German governments agreed to close the base. The last military passenger and cargo flights took place in late September 2005 and the base's formal closure ceremony took place on 10 October 2005. The final handover to the German government occurred on 30 December 2005 and the 726th AMS transferred to Spangdahlem Air Base. The Frankfurt Airport Authority has leveled the entire base, and in October 2015, commenced building a third passenger terminal (Terminal 3) and other airport facilities.

In 2019, it became known that excavated soil from the construction site for Terminal 3 was contaminated with PFAS chemicals with the volume of polluted soil being approximately 600,000 cubic metres. It was considered highly probable that the contamination originated with firefighting foams which had been used by the USAFE, primarily for training purposes.

See also

 1983 Rhein-Main Starfighter crash

References

 Endicott, Judy G., USAF Active Flying, Space, and Missile Squadrons as of 1 October 1995. Office of Air Force History
 Fletcher, Harry R., Air Force Bases Volume II, Active Air Force Bases outside the United States of America on 17 September 1982, Office of Air Force History, 1989
 Maurer Maurer, Air Force Combat Units Of World War II, Office of Air Force History, 1983
 Ravenstein, Charles A., Air Force Combat Wings Lineage and Honors Histories 1947–1977,  Office of Air Force History, 1984
 Rogers, Brian, United States Air Force Unit Designations Since 1978, 2005
 Tart, Larry and Keefe, Robert. The Price of Vigilance: Attacks on American Surveillance Flights. NY: Ballantine Books, 2001. 656 p.
 USAAS-USAAC-USAAF-USAF Aircraft Serial Numbers—1908 to Present

External links

 Rhein Main Air Base Facebook Page
 Rhein Main Air Base Reunion 2015 Facebook Group
 Rhein Main Air Base Reunion 2015 Website
 IX Engineer Command Airfield Information
 Rhein Main Aerial Port Squadron information and Reunion Group
 Rhein Main Military Dependents Reunion Group
 435th OMS Enroute MX
 

Airfields of the United States Army Air Forces Air Transport Command in the European Theater
Buildings and structures in Hesse
History of Hesse
Installations of the United States Air Force in Germany
Military installations closed in 2005
Airports in Hesse